Copiapoa echinoides is a species of cactus in South America.

The species is native to the Atacama Desert in northern Chile.

Description

References
 
 

Cactoideae
Cacti of South America
Endemic flora of Chile
Flora of northern Chile
Atacama Desert
Near threatened flora of South America